A squirrel king is a collection of squirrels whose tails have tangled together, making them unable to separate themselves. It is similar to a phenomenon recorded in rats, the rat king. A squirrel king starts as a litter of young in the same nest, whose tails become knotted together by nesting materials and/or by tree sap gluing the tails together, particularly if the young squirrels have been gnawing bark of the tree that their nest is in, letting sap flow. If the squirrels are not separated, they may fall to the ground still joined to each other when they try to come out of their nest, and will invariably die unless separated through human intervention. Unlike the rat king, the squirrel king is not found in medieval European literature.

The term rat king comes from the German, used to describe for persons who lived off others.

List of naturally occurring incidents

Unnatural incidents
There have been incidents of animal cruelty or taxidermic artwork, where humans tied the tails of squirrels together, making something resembling the natural squirrel king.

Incidents of animal cruelty

 On 19 September 2019, 4 squirrels were found knotted together and tied up, on railroad tracks in Berlin, Connecticut, USA. They survived to be separated, but needed some amputation. In order to tie them up, the person who performed the act had to break their tails.

References

Further reading

External links
 
 
 
Animal cruelty incidents
Squirrels